Mir Yeshiva or Mirrer Yeshiva may refer to:

 Mir Yeshiva (Belarus)
 Mir Yeshiva (Brooklyn)
 Mir Yeshiva (Jerusalem)
 Mir Brachfeld, branch of Mir Yeshiva in Modi'in Illit